Frank D. Yuengling Mansion is a historic home located in Pottsville, Schuylkill County, Pennsylvania. It was built in 1913, and is a large three-story dwelling in the Tudor-Jacobean style. It is constructed of brick, stucco, and half-timbering and contains 20-plus rooms. It features side and rear porches, a front portico, stone facing, and many gables, overhanging balconies, and brick chimneys. Also located on the property are a contributing Jacobean style garage, formal garden with decorative statuary and sundial, and sunken garden with gazebo. It was built by Frank D. Yuengling of the Yuengling brewery, grandson of David Yuengling. The house is used as a cultural center and education facility, managed by the Schuylkill County Council For The Arts.

It was added to the National Register of Historic Places in 1979.

References

External links

Devlin, Ron. "History Book: Reading architect designed Yuengling mansion." Reading, Pennsylvania: Reading Eagle, December 12, 2013.
Dougherty, Ryan. "Yuengling: An American Tradition." University Park, Pennsylvania: The Pennsylvania Center for the Book, Pennsylvania State University, 2009.
Yuengling Mansion, Schuylkill County Council For The Arts website

Photographs

Houses on the National Register of Historic Places in Pennsylvania
Jacobean architecture in Pennsylvania
Houses completed in 1913
Houses in Schuylkill County, Pennsylvania
1913 establishments in Pennsylvania
National Register of Historic Places in Schuylkill County, Pennsylvania